Błaszczyk, Błaszczak, Blaščik, Blaščak, Blashchuk, or Blashchak Blasscyk is a surname.

The surname is derived from Slavic diminutives of the given name Blasius. Błaszczyk and Błaszczak are the standard Polish variants, with Błaszczyk about four times more common. A variant with a Ukrainian/Belarusian ending (-uk) is found at a lower frequency in Poland, mainly in the east.

People 
 Mariusz Błaszczak (born 1969), Polish politician
 Ewa Błaszczyk (born 1955), Polish actress
 Grzegorz Błaszczyk (born 1953), Polish historian
 Lucjan Błaszczyk (born 1974), Polish table tennis player
 Iwona Blazwick (born 1955), British art critic, director of the Whitechapel Art Gallery

References 

Polish-language surnames
Surnames from given names